Reema Sen (born 29 October 1981) is an Indian actress and model who primarily appeared in Bengali theatre films, Tamil, Telugu, and Hindi films.

Early life and education
Sen was born in Kolkata on 29 October 1981. She completed high school from St. Thomas Girls School in Kidderpore, Kolkata, after which her family moved to Mumbai.

Personal life

Reema Sen married businessman Shiv Karan Singh in 2022. She gave birth to their son, Rudraveer, on 22 February 2023.

Career

Film and modelling career
In Mumbai, she began her modelling career, appearing in a number of advertising campaigns. She then moved to films and made her acting debut with Telugu film Chitram, in which she acted opposite Uday Kiran, whom she later paired with in Manasantha Nuvve. She also appeared in the Tamil film Minnale alongside Madhavan, which was very successful. Her first Hindi film Hum Ho Gaye Aapke flopped, and she decided to continue working in Tamil cinema. Her appearance in the Tamil film Rendu, again alongside Madhavan, was successful. Audience found her expressions in the film Thimiru cute.  Her negative role in Aayirathil Oruvan and Vallavan was highly praised by viewers and critics.

She ended her film career in 2012 after she got married. Her last Bollywood film was Gangs of Wasseypur alongside Manoj Bajpayee, Nawazuddin Siddiqui and Richa Chadda.

Music video appearance
In 1998, she appeared in the video of the song "Chandni Raatein" sung by Shamsa Kanwal.

Public image

In April 2006, a Madurai court issued non-bailable warrants against Sen and Shilpa Shetty for "posing in an obscene manner" in photographs published by the Tamil newspaper Dinakaran, owned by Sun Group. The report stated that the two actresses had failed to comply with earlier summons for the same reason, hence the issuance of the warrants. The petitioner submitted that the paper had published "very sexy blow-ups and medium blow-ups" in its December 2005 and January 2006 issues, and which allegedly violated the Indecent Representation of Women (Prohibition) Act 1986, Young Persons (Harmful Publications) Act 1956, and the Indian Penal Code Section 292 (Sale of Obscene Books). The petitioner further demanded that the images should be confiscated under the terms of the Press and Registration of Book Act 1867.

In January 2007, outgoing Chief Justice Y. K. Sabharwal confirmed that Sen had written to him in order to enunciate guidelines against frivolous lawsuits against artists, but declined her plea on the grounds that she should have filed a formal petition instead of writing a letter.

Filmography

See also
 List of Indian film actresses

References

External links

 
 
 
 

1981 births
Living people
Indian film actresses
Actresses in Tamil cinema
Actresses in Bengali cinema
Actresses from Kolkata
Actresses in Hindi cinema
Actresses in Telugu cinema
Actresses in Kannada cinema
21st-century Indian actresses
Filmfare Awards South winners
Female models from Kolkata